Husbands or Lovers may refer to the following films:

 Nju - Eine unverstandene Frau, English title: Husbands or Lovers (1924 film), a German silent film
 alternate title of Honeymoon in Bali, a 1939 American romantic comedy

See also
 Husbands and Lovers, a 1924 film starring Lewis Stone
 Husband and Lovers, a 1991 Italian erotic-drama film